Kevin Zonzini (born 11 August 1997) is a Sammarinese footballer who plays as a midfielder for Tre Penne and the San Marino national team.

Career
Zonzini made his international debut for San Marino on 5 September 2020 in the UEFA Nations League against Gibraltar.

Career statistics

International

References

External links
 
 
 

1997 births
Living people
Sammarinese footballers
San Marino youth international footballers
San Marino under-21 international footballers
San Marino international footballers
Campionato Sammarinese di Calcio players
Association football midfielders
A.S.D. Victor San Marino players
S.S. Cosmos players